D. J. Rogers is the debut album by D. J. Rogers.

Released in 1973 on Shelter Records. This was the only album released on Shelter by D. J. Rogers before moving on to RCA Records a couple years later.

Track listing
All songs written and arranged by D. J. Rogers

"Listen to the Message" – 3:43
"Where There's a Will" – 3:27
"Take Time" – 5:12
"Watch Out for the Riders" – 3:11
"March On" – 3:09
"Celebration" – 3:52
"It's All Over" – 4:33
"Don't You Want to Ride" – 8:07
"Bail Out" – 4:20

Personnel
D. J. Rogers - vocals, backing vocals
Fred Allen – drums
Patricia Hall – backing vocals
Keith Hatchell – bass
Marlo Henderson – guitar, backing vocals
Andre Lewis – bass, backing vocals
Maxayn Lewis – backing vocals
Kenneth Loper – organ
Clarence McDonald – piano; string and horn arrangements on "Take Time", "Watch Out for the Riders" and "It's All Over"
Scott Sansby - drums
Marsha Smith – backing vocals
Rhonghea Southern – rhythm guitar, backing vocals
Sidigi Southern – backing vocals
E.T. Thomas – drums
David T. Walker – guitar
Lalomie Washburn – backing vocals
Bobby Watson (from Rufus) – bass
Ron Woods – drums
Stanley Lee Ensemble - backing vocals
Technical
Andrea Cohen - cover photography

Critical reception

Don Lass of the Asbury Park Press wrote "D.J. Rogers is into modern R&B and soul on his debut album, titled simply D.J. Rogers (SW-8915), and it shows that he has the potential of reaching the top of the ladder in his field. His 'Watch for the Riders' and 'March On' have hit possibilities." With a four out of five stars rating Stephen Cook of Allmusic called the album "A soul classic". Will Smith of the Omaha World Herald stated "Singer D.J. Rogers conveys more of a blues feeling than many current soul vocalists. His D.J. Rogers (Shelter-SW 895) is a fully realized and nicely varied collection. It's a welcome respite from  the run-of-the-mill soul offerings." Rick Atkinson of The Record remarked that "D J. Rogers opens the show for Leon Russell on tour, and he's now represented by an album called D J Rogers. He is basically an R&B artist, and at his best he can be used as a definition of the word 'Soul'. On his album he is at his best, especially with material like 'March On' and 'Celebration'."

External links
 D. J. Rogers-D. J. Rogers at Discogs

References

1973 debut albums
D. J. Rogers albums
Shelter Records albums